Prionurus punctatus, is a tropical fish found in reefs in the East Pacific from the Gulf of California to El Salvador. It is commonly known as the Yellowtail surgeonfish. It is sometimes used in aquariums. The 3 bony spines sticking out of their tail allow for a sharp defense mechanism, which can be harmful to both other fish and fisherman.

It is found in schools on shallow reefs, feeding diurnally and primarily on algae in rocky areas. It is generally a nonselective grazer, but avoid  brown (Dictyota, Padina, Sargassum) and red algae (Liagora).

References

External links
 

Prionurus
Fish described in 1862